was a Japanese lieutenant general during World War II.

Early life
In 1910 he entered the Imperial Japanese Army Academy.

Japanese invasion of French Indochina

Nakamura participated in the Japanese invasion of French Indochina in 1940 at the head of the 5th Division.

Later years

On January 4, 1943, he received the post of General Officer in Thailand, first called the Siam Garrison Command, then the Japanese Thirty-ninth Army, and finally on July 7, 1945 the 18th Area Army. At the end of the war, he surrendered his troops to the allies and took his retirement in 1946.

References

Further reading

Southeast Asian Minorities in the Wartime Japanese Empire

Japanese military personnel of World War II
1889 births
1966 deaths
Japanese generals